Israel Machado Campelo Andrade (born January 17, 1960 in Salvador), commonly known as Israel Andrade or simply Israel, is a former professional basketball player from Brazil.

Professional career
During his pro club career, Andrade won 4 Brazilian Championships, in the seasons 1982, 1985, 1986 (I), and 1986 (II), while a member of C.A. Monte Líbano.

National team career
Andrade played with the senior Brazilian national basketball team at three consecutive Summer Olympic Games, at the 1984 Summer Olympic Games, the 1988 Summer Olympic games, and the 1992 Summer Olympic Games. Andrade was also a member of the Brazilian national team that won the gold medal at the 1987 Pan American Games, where he scored 78 points in seven games during the tournament. He also played at the 1982 FIBA World Cup, the 1986 FIBA World Cup, and the 1990 FIBA World Cup.

References

External links

Italian League Profile 
CBB Profile 

1960 births
Living people
Basketball players at the 1984 Summer Olympics
Basketball players at the 1987 Pan American Games
Basketball players at the 1988 Summer Olympics
Basketball players at the 1992 Summer Olympics
Basket Rimini Crabs players
Brazilian men's basketball players
1982 FIBA World Championship players
1990 FIBA World Championship players
Centers (basketball)
Clube Atlético Monte Líbano basketball players
Fabriano Basket players
Libertas Liburnia Basket Livorno players
Olympic basketball players of Brazil
Pallacanestro Virtus Roma players
Pan American Games gold medalists for Brazil
Pan American Games medalists in basketball
Sport Club Corinthians Paulista basketball players
Sportspeople from Salvador, Bahia
1986 FIBA World Championship players
Medalists at the 1987 Pan American Games